Maxie Thomas Lambright (June 23, 1924 – January 28, 1980) was an American football coach and college athletics administrator. He served as the head coach of the Louisiana Tech Bulldogs football team from 1967 to 1978 and the Louisiana Tech University athletic director from 1970 to 1978. He led Louisiana Tech to three Division II National Championships and seven conference championships. Lambright coached the legendary quarterback Terry Bradshaw. Lambright played college football at Southern Miss from 1946 to 1948 and graduated in 1949 from the University of Southern Mississippi in Hattiesburg, Mississippi.

Lambright is a member of the Louisiana Tech Athletic Hall of Fame, Louisiana Sports Hall of Fame, and the University of Southern Mississippi Sports Hall of Fame (Class of 1974).

Lambright died on January 28, 1980, in Ruston, Louisiana, after a stroke at his home the day prior.

Head coaching record

College

References

External links
 

1924 births
1980 deaths
Louisiana Tech Bulldogs and Lady Techsters athletic directors
Louisiana Tech Bulldogs football coaches
Southern Miss Golden Eagles football coaches
Southern Miss Golden Eagles football players
High school football coaches in Louisiana
High school football coaches in Mississippi
People from McComb, Mississippi
People from Alexandria, Louisiana
Sportspeople from Hattiesburg, Mississippi
People from Ruston, Louisiana